Peter Richard Norman Johnson  (1923–2003) served with the Royal Australian Air Force during World War II and was a distinguished architect in his native Australia.

Early life 
Johnson was born in Armadale, Victoria to Frank and Marian Johnson and later attended Bellevue Hill Public School and Sydney Boys High School. He spent one year studying engineering at Sydney Technical College before joining the Royal Australian Air Force. At the outbreak of war, he was sent to Canada for training.  After completing his training, Flight Lieutenant Johnson arrived in England and spent his leave at Stonewall, Kent. It was here he met Jane Meade-Waldo who he married on 24 March 1944. Eighteen days later, Jane received news that Johnson's Lancaster Bomber had been shot down during a night bombing mission over France.

Johnson and his navigator escaped their stricken aircraft and were rescued near Amiens. Johnson was disguised as a mute peasant and hidden by the French Resistance for six months. Towards the end of the war, Johnson made his way back to England and with Jane, returned to Australia.

Career 
After the war, Johnson studied architecture at the University of Sydney. Following his graduation he entered the architectural firm of Kenneth McConnel. In 1954, they were joined by Stanley Smith and founded McConnel Smith and Johnson. In 1960, Johnson emerged as a leading creative talent and became the founding president of the Architectural Society. Johnson's family house in Chatswood won the 1964 RAIA Wilkinson Award, influencing the development of the Sydney School. In 1967, Johnson was appointed Professor of Architecture at the University of Sydney and was head of the school of undergraduate studies between 1968–1986. In 1988, he became chancellor of the University of Technology, Sydney.

Notable Works 
 The Chatswood House (1963) 
 Kindersley House, 20-22 O'Connell St, Sydney (1958) 
 Swire House, 8 Spring St (1960) 
 Metropolitan and Water and Drainage Board Building (1960) 
 University of Sydney Law School, 148A-160 King Street, Sydney (1969) 
 Commonwealth State Law Courts Building, 237-241 Macquarie St (1976) 
 Benjamin Offices, Belconnen

Awards and recognition 

In 1964, Johnson was awarded the Royal Australian Institute of Architects Wilkinson Award for his Chatswood Residence.

In 1979, Johnson received the Officer of the Order of Australia and was promoted to Companion of the Order of Australia in 2002. In 1987, the architectural archive of the National Library, Canberra was named the Peter Johnson Architectural Archive.

In the late 1990s, UTS named their new home of Faculty of Design, Architecture and Building the Peter Johnson Building.

Positions Held 

 Life Fellowship of the Royal Australian Institute of Architects
 Fellow of the Royal Institute of British Architects
 Fellow of the American Institute of Architects
 Fellow of the Royal Canadian Institute of Architects 
 Foundation Chairman, Architectural Society
 Professor of Architecture, University of Sydney
 Chancellor of the University of Technology, Sydney
 Inaugural Chair of the Conference of Heads of Schools of Architecture, Australia 
 Doctor of Architecture (Honoris Causa), University of Sydney
 Doctor of University (Honoris Causa) University of Technology, Sydney
 Chairman, Board of Directors of Architecture Media
 Board Member, National Trust of Australia (NSW)
 Chair, Conservation Committee and Architectural Advisory Committee, National Trust of Australia

Bibliography

References 

Architects from Sydney
Companions of the Order of Australia
1923 births
2003 deaths
Royal Australian Air Force personnel of World War II
Royal Australian Air Force officers
Shot-down aviators
Military personnel from Melbourne
20th-century Australian architects
People educated at Sydney Boys High School
University of Sydney alumni